This is a list of Roman domes. The Romans were the first builders in the history of architecture to realize the potential of domes for the creation of large and well-defined interior spaces. Domes were introduced in a number of Roman building types such as temples, thermae, palaces, mausolea and later also churches. Semi-domes also became a favoured architectural element and were adopted as apses in Christian church architecture.

Monumental domes began to appear in the 1st century BC in Rome and the provinces around the Mediterranean Sea. Along with vaults and trusses, they gradually replaced the traditional post and lintel construction which makes use of the column and architrave. The construction of domes was greatly facilitated by the invention of concrete, a process which has been termed the Roman Architectural Revolution.  Their enormous dimensions remained unsurpassed until the introduction of structural steel frames in the late 19th century (see List of largest domes).

Domes 
All diameters are clear span in m; for polygonal domes applies to the in-circle diameter. Main source is Jürgen Rasch's study of Roman domes (1985).

Half-domes

See also 

 Record-holding domes in antiquity
 List of world's largest domes
 List of Domes in France
 History of Roman and Byzantine domes
 Ancient Roman architecture
 History of early and simple domes

References

Sources 
Main source

Further sources

External links 
 Traianus — Technical investigation of Roman public works
 The Roman Pantheon: The Triumph of Concrete

Domes
List of Roman domes